Pir Bakran (also Romanized as Pīr Bakrān; also known as Pīr Bāqerān; formerly known as Linjan لنجان) is a city and capital of Pir Bakran District, in Falavarjan County, Isfahan Province, Iran. At the 2006 census, its population was 10,851, in 2,934 families. It is located southwest by road from Isfahan.

Sights
It contains the mausoleum of Muhammad ibn Bakran, a Sufi saint who taught theology outside the existing structure at the site. The iwan was constructed to serve as his classroom, but was uncompleted at the time of his death in 1303. The structure was later modified to function as his mausoleum.

The ancient cemetery of the Jews of Esfahan is situated close to this complex. It contains tombs inscribed from the 2nd century AD. The major mausoleum contains the tomb attributed to the biblical person Serah bat Asher. For Jews this is a place of pilgrimage.

For its public transit system, The city is served by Falavarjan County Municipalities Mass Transit Organization bus network route 3.

Images of Serah bar Asher cemetery

See also 

 Pir Bakran mausoleum

References

External links 
 Square Kufic decoration at the Muhammad ibn Bakran shrine

Populated places in Falavarjan County
Cities in Isfahan Province
Jewish cemeteries
Ziyarat